Gentryville, Missouri may refer to:

Gentryville, Douglas County, Missouri
Gentryville, Gentry County, Missouri